Polish Judges Association "Iustitia" is a self-governing association of Polish judges.

In late 2010s the organization has been described as "extremely active in defending the rule of law in Poland".

References

External links 

 Organization's homepage (English version)

Organizations established in 1990
1990 establishments in Poland
Legal organizations based in Poland